Neo Keramidi is a village and a part of the municipality of Katerini. The 2011 census recorded 464 inhabitants in the village.

See also
Katerini
List of settlements in the Pieria regional unit

References

Populated places in Pieria (regional unit)